Français pour une nuit (English: French for One Night) is a live DVD by the American heavy metal band Metallica, recorded in Nîmes, France, in the Arena of Nîmes on July 7, 2009, during the World Magnetic Tour.  It was released in three formats: A standard DVD in a digipak including a 16-page booklet, a Blu-ray, and a digipak with the booklet and a deluxe limited edition box set including the DVD, a copy of Death Magnetic on CD, a T-shirt, laminated pass, and five exclusive photos. Despite only being issued in France, it has been imported in sufficient quantity to be considered a regular release. Aside from the photography by Ross Halfin, the entire project was made by French professionals, from the video to the art direction.

Track listing
"The Ecstasy of Gold" (Intro) – 2:40
"Blackened" – 5:40
"Creeping Death" – 6:25
"Fuel" – 4:33
"Harvester of Sorrow" – 6:07
"Fade to Black" – 8:40
"Broken, Beat & Scarred" – 6:35
"Cyanide" – 7:52
"Sad but True" – 5:43
"One" – 7:53
"All Nightmare Long" – 9:32
"The Day That Never Comes" – 8:30
"Master of Puppets" – 8:40
"Dyers Eve" – 6:36
"Nothing Else Matters" – 5:54
"Enter Sandman" – 9:20
"Stone Cold Crazy" – 2:30
"Motorbreath" – 5:44
"Seek & Destroy" – 13:07

Personnel
James Hetfield – lead vocals, rhythm guitar
Kirk Hammett – lead guitar, backing vocals
Robert Trujillo – bass, backing vocals
Lars Ulrich – drums

Charts

Certifications

References

Live video albums
2009 video albums
Metallica video albums
2009 live albums
Metallica live albums
Universal Records live albums
Universal Records video albums
Nîmes